The Klang Valley Integrated Transit System is an integrated transport network that primarily serves the area of Klang Valley and Greater Kuala Lumpur. The system currently consists of 11 fully operating rail lines; two commuter rail lines, five rapid transit lines, one bus rapid transit line and two airport rail links to the Kuala Lumpur International Airport (and its low-cost terminal klia2) and another one to the Sultan Abdul Aziz Shah Airport.

History

Initially, different competing companies operated the various transit systems and had developed these rail and bus systems separately and at various times.

As a result, many of these systems did not integrate well with the others, making transferring from system to system inconvenient for passengers.

Aggravated by Kuala Lumpur's poor pedestrian network, moving from one rail system to another often required a lot of walking, stair-climbing, and escalator-use.

Integrated tickets for all rail-based systems called the  cards allow passengers to transfer seamlessly across all stations and lines in the Klang Valley region.

Integration
This enables commuters to transfer between lines the interchange stations without buying a new ticket each time, provided that they do not exit the paid area.

The Touch 'n Go stored value fare card is accepted as a mode of payment on the Rapid Bus system, LRT, MRT, BRT, and monorail lines, as well as the KTM Komuter, easing the hassle of buying separate tickets for travelling on different networks. However, the fare integration for the Rapid KL system does not include other rail systems such as KTM Komuter and Express Rail Link.

Rapid Rail, the operator of the LRT, MRT, monorail, BRT lines, and Rapid Bus (which covers about 70% of the Klang Valley's bus network), has launched a daily bus ticket which costs as low as RM1, and an integrated transit daily pass which can be used on both its rail and bus services costing RM7.

System network 

[
  {
    "type": "ExternalData",
    "service": "geoshape",
    "ids": "Q1865",
    "properties": {
      "stroke": "#000000",
      "fill-opacity": 0.2,
      "stroke-width": 5
    }
  },
  {
  "type": "ExternalData",
  "service": "geoline",
  "ids": "Q4207166",
  "properties": {
    "stroke": "#1964b7",
    "stroke-width": 6
  }
  },

{
  "type": "ExternalData",
  "service": "geoline",
  "ids": "Q4873303",
  "properties": {
    "stroke": "#dc241f",
    "stroke-width": 6
  }
  },

{
  "type": "ExternalData",
  "service": "geoline",
  "ids": "Q474391",
  "properties": {
    "stroke": "#721422",
    "stroke-width": 6
  }
  },

{
  "type": "ExternalData",
  "service": "geoline",
  "ids": "Q248445",
  "properties": {
    "stroke": "#e0115f",
    "stroke-width": 6
  }
  },

{
  "type": "ExternalData",
  "service": "geoline",
  "ids": "Q1431592",
  "properties": {
    "stroke": "#800080",
    "stroke-width": 6
  }
  },

{
  "type": "ExternalData",
  "service": "geoline",
  "ids": "Q1790833",
  "properties": {
    "stroke": "#7dba00",
    "stroke-width": 6
  }
},

{
    "type": "ExternalData",
    "service": "geoline",
    "ids": "Q6717618",
    "properties": {
      "stroke": "#008000",
      "stroke-width": 6
    }
  },

{
  "type": "ExternalData",
  "service": "geoline",
  "ids": "Q51419215",
  "properties": {
    "stroke": "#8d5b2d",
    "stroke-width": 6
  }
  },
{
  "type": "ExternalData",
  "service": "geoline",
  "ids": "Q16255640",
  "properties": {
    "stroke": "#1e4d2b",
    "stroke-width": 6
  }
},
{
  "type": "ExternalData",
  "service": "geoline",
  "ids": "Q17053935",
  "properties": {
    "stroke": "#ffcc00",
    "stroke-width": 6
  }
},
]
The KTM Komuter, a commuter rail service, was introduced in 1995 as the first rail transit system to provide local rail services in Kuala Lumpur and the surrounding Klang Valley suburban areas. Light rapid transit (LRT) lines and monorail line were introduced later on to serve the urban Kuala Lumpur area and its satellite towns. (i.e. Ampang, Petaling Jaya, Gombak, etc) The mass rapid transit (MRT) lines aims to connect the outskirts of the Klang Valley (i.e. Sungai Buloh, Putrajaya, Kajang) with the city centre. Malaysia's first bus rapid transit (BRT) line was introduced to ease pedestrian traffic in Bandar Sunway, a thriving leisure and entertainment township in Subang Jaya. 3 airport rail links connect the city centre with the 3 major airports of the Klang Valley, two to the Kuala Lumpur International Airport (KLIA) and klia2, and one to the Sultan Abdul Aziz Shah Airport in Subang.

Proposed and Future lines

The construction of the third KVMRT line, the Circle Line is expected to commence in 2023.

Fleet

Gallery

Notes

References

External links 
 Klang Valley Integrated Transit Map - Official
 KUALA LUMPUR METRO MAP on INAT MAPS

Public transport in Malaysia